Asemolea is a genus of longhorn beetles in the tribe Calliini.

 Asemolea crassicornis Bates, 1881
 Asemolea flava Martins & Galileo, 2006
 Asemolea macaranduba Galileo & Martins, 1998
 Asemolea minuta (Bates, 1872)
 Asemolea purpuricollis Bates, 1885
 Asemolea setosa Bates, 1881

References

Calliini
Cerambycidae genera